Urmas Reitelmann (born on 9 July 1958 in Tallinn) is an Estonian radio and television personality, producer, journalist and politician. He has been member of XIV Riigikogu.

1981-1983 he studied at University of Tartu. 1981-1990 he worked at Estonian Television, acting as a newsreader, presenter. 1997-2009 he worked at several television channels, acting as a news editor, presenter. He has been a producer for several television series, eg V.E.R.I., Kuldvillak ('Jeopardy!'), Kes tahab saada miljonäriks? ('Who Wants to Be a Millionaire?)'.

Since 2017 he is a member of Conservative People's Party of Estonia.

References

1958 births
20th-century Estonian people
21st-century Estonian people
Conservative People's Party of Estonia politicians
Estonian journalists
Estonian radio personalities
Estonian television personalities
Estonian television presenters
Estonian television producers
Living people
Members of the Riigikogu, 2019–2023
People from Tallinn
Politicians from Tallinn
University of Tartu alumni